The Eurovans are a family of passenger automobiles from the Citroën, Peugeot, Fiat and Lancia marques that were produced at the jointly owned Sevel Nord factory in France. The term Eurovan was not used by the brands themselves in sales literature, but rather by the motoring press to refer to the vans collectively. It was launched in March 1994, and production ceased in November 2010 for the Fiat and Lancia models, and in June 2014 for the Citroën and Peugeot siblings. They are considered to be large MPVs.

The Eurovans differ little technically and visually, being a prime example of badge engineering. They share mechanicals and body structure with the Sevel Nord light commercial vans, the Citroën Jumpy (Dispatch), Fiat Scudo and Peugeot Expert.

The first generation Eurovans were marketed as the Citroën Evasion (Citroën Synergie in the UK), Fiat Ulysse, Lancia Zeta and Peugeot 806. The second generation models were all renamed, except the Fiat Ulysse, with the nameplates now Citroën C8, Lancia Phedra and Peugeot 807.

First generation (1994–2002) 

The first generation Eurovans were introduced in June 1994. They are smaller than American vans, like the Chrysler Voyager, which is also available in Europe. Like the Toyota Previa, and American minivans, they had sliding rear side doors, a trait they share with their commercial siblings. While the Voyager also came in "Grand" versions with elongated body and wheelbase (and the Espace followed suit in 1997), the Eurovans only came in one size.

The Eurovans were almost identical, the differences consisting in different grilles, lower tailgates/taillights, wheel covers/alloy wheels and exterior and interior badging, as well as different trim levels. In October 1998, the Eurovans were mildly facelifted.

Inside, the gear lever was mounted on the dashboard rather than on the floor, and the handbrake is on the door side of the driver's seat, which allowed for the removal of middle console and opened up a passage between the front seats. The seating configurations included two fixed seats (swivelling on some models) in front and three individual removable seats in the middle row, along with optional two individual removable seats or a three seater bench in the third row.

Engines 
The first generation Eurovans utilized PSA's XU/XUD engines, regardless of brand. They were later replaced by the PSA EW/DW engine. All were mated to five speed manual transmissions, apart from the 2.0 16-valve EW petrol engine, which had an option of a four speed automatic.

Model differences

Citroën Evasion 

The Evasion was badged Synergie in the RHD markets of both the United Kingdom and Ireland. However, the car maintained the Evasion name in New Zealand. In October 1998, the Citroën Evasion got a slight facelift, including a larger logo and a restyling of the front grille and rear bumper. More than 120,000 Evasion/Synergie were produced.

Peugeot 806 

The 806 was named according to Peugeot's "x0x" system, where the first digit indicates model series (vehicle size/class) and the last indicates the generation, with a central zero. The largest Peugeot series then available was the executive saloon 605, so Peugeot chose 8, potentially leaving room for an in between model. The Eurovans were launched when Peugeot was replacing the "x05" with "x06" models, so it was appropriately labeled "806".

Fiat Ulysse 

The Fiat was named after Ulysses, the Roman name for Odysseus, the hero of Homer's Odyssey. Like its siblings, the Ulysse range received a facelift in October 1998.

Lancia Zeta 

Following the traditional naming theme, Lancia named its variant with the previously unused Greek letter Zeta. With its big chrome grille, the Lancia served as the "premium" Eurovan, not available with base engines and exceptionally well equipped, with prices up to 20% higher than corresponding versions of other Eurovans. The Zeta was not marketed in the UK.

Second generation (2002–2014)  

In 2002, the second generation of the Eurovans was launched. The 807 itself was launched in June, followed by the C8 in July. The floorpan, wheelbase, and postponement were not transformed, but all exterior dimensions, including front and rear tracks, were increased. The increase in length of almost 30 cm greatly enhanced interior volume. The new Eurovans were afforded a much more bubbly, contemporary look, along with a modern looking dashboard with centrally mounted gauges.

The differences between the various versions were more marked, surrounding full front fascias and rear sections (including head and tail lights), as well as different interior colour themes. The middle and third row seats now had fore/aft sliders to increase flexibility and also adjustable backs. As with the first generation, a three seater bench seat was available in the third row, slotting into the standard third row seat runners, with back-lowering and tilt forward arrangements to increase boot space.

The Fiat and the Lancia were slightly wider than PSA vans, and the Phedra was longer than the other Eurovans.

The Citroën C8 and Peugeot 807 also got two light facelifts: the first one in February 2008, and the second one in 2012.

To highlight the launch of the V6 engine, Peugeot presented a design study called Peugeot 807 Grand Tourisme at the 2003 Geneva Motor Show. Despite the fancier four passenger interior and some mechanical and visual tuning, the car was essentially a top-of-the-line 807.

Engines 
The engine range comprised again of different versions of the PSA EW/DW engine, paired with either five-speed manual or four-speed automatic transmissions. A six-speed manual option was added in the United Kingdom in the end of 2004. Additionally, top-of-the-line versions came with the PSA ES V6.

All diesels were PSA's HDIs, but Fiat models used JTD badging.

Model differences

Citroën C8 

Citroën chose to put the minivan in line with its new naming theme, where models were called Cx (x being a number roughly corresponding to the relative size of a given model), hence the Citroën C8.

Peugeot 807 

The 807 replaced the 806.

Fiat Ulysse 

Fiat retained the Ulysse name for its second generation. The direct successor was the Fiat Freemont.

Lancia Phedra 

As the new Lancias didn't use Greek letters in the 2000s (until the Lancia Delta was reintroduced in 2008), the new minivan was called Lancia Phedra, in honour of the Greek mythological figure Phaedra. The successor was the Lancia Voyager.

Sales and production figures

References 

Cars introduced in 1994
Minivans